This is a list of diplomatic missions of Croatia, excluding honorary consulates. Croatia is a European country located at the crossroads of Central Europe, Southeast Europe, and the Mediterranean.

Current missions

Africa

Americas

Asia

Europe

Oceania

Multilateral organizations

Gallery

Closed missions

Africa

See also
 Foreign relations of Croatia

Notes

References

 Ministry of Foreign Affairs of Croatia

Diplomatic missions of Croatia
Croatia